The 2019–20 Austrian Football Bundesliga, also known as Tipico Bundesliga for sponsorship reasons, was the 108th season of top-tier football in Austria. Red Bull Salzburg are the six-times defending champions.

In March 2020 the league matches were postponed due to the COVID-19 pandemic.

Teams

Changes
Wacker Innsbruck were relegated after just one season. WSG Tirol was promoted as champions of the 2018–19 Austrian Football Second League for the first time since 1970–71 season.

Stadia and locations

Regular season

League table

Results

Championship round 
The points obtained during the regular season were halved (and rounded down) before the start of the playoff. As a result, the teams started with the following points before the playoff: Red Bull Salzburg 24, LASK 21 points, Rapid Wien 20, Wolfsberger AC 19, Sturm Graz 16, and Hartberg 14.The points of Hartberg were rounded down – in the event of any ties on points at the end of the playoffs, a half point will be added for this team.

Relegation round 

The points obtained during the regular season were halved (and rounded down) before the start of the playoff. As a result, the teams started with the following points before the playoff: Austria Wien 12, Rheindorf Altach 12, Admira Wacker Mödling 9, WSG Tirol 9, Mattersburg 9, and St. Pölten 8. The points of Austria Wien, Admira Wacker Mödling, WSG Tirol, and St. Pölten were rounded down – in the event of any ties on points at the end of the playoffs, a half point will be added for these teams.

Europa League play-offs 
The winner and the runner-up of the relegation round played a one-legged play-off semi-final match against each other. The winner played a two-legged final against the fifth-placed team from the championship round to determine the third Europa League participant.

Semi-final

Final 

Hartberg won 3–2 on aggregate.

Statistics

Top scorers

Awards

Team of the Year

References

External links
  

Austrian Football Bundesliga seasons
Aus
1
Austrian Bundesliga